Frederick Lewis Storey (March 3, 1932 – December 2, 2019) was a Canadian curler from Calgary. He won three World Curling Championships and three Brier Championships playing as lead on the Ron Northcott rink.

Storey grew up in Empress, Alberta and moved to Calgary in high school, and won a provincial school boys title for Mount Royal in 1951, and finished runner up at that year's school boy championship (now the Canadian Junior Curling Championships) playing for the Bob Harper rink. He also played baseball in high school. 

At the time of the 1960 Brier, he worked for Pacific Petroleums as chief clerk of inventory and equipment control. He was married in 1959 to Donna Chaput.

References

External links

 Frederick Storey – Curling Canada Stats Archive
 Video:  (YouTube-channel «Curling Canada»)

2019 deaths
1932 births
People from Special Areas, Alberta
Brier champions
World curling champions
Canadian male curlers
Curlers from Calgary
20th-century Canadian people